Thomas Henry Haines (born August 9, 1933) is an American author, biochemist and academic. He was a professor of Chemistry at City College of New York and of Biochemistry at the Sophie Davis School of Biomedical Education and is currently a Visiting Professor  in the Laboratory of Thomas Sakmar at Rockefeller University. He also serves on the board of the Graham School, a social services and foster care agency in New York City. His scientific research has focused on the structure and function of the living cell membrane. He is the father of Avril Haines, the seventh director of National Intelligence.

Early life and education 
Thomas Haines was born on August 9, 1933, to Elsie Cubbon Haines (1894–1955) and Charles Haines, who deserted when Haines was two. In 1937, "by reason of the insanity of the mother", a judge placed him at the Graham School, an orphanage in Hastings-on-Hudson, New York. The orphanage, now a foster care agency, was founded in 1806 by Isabella Graham and Elizabeth Hamilton, the recently widowed wife of Alexander Hamilton. Haines remained at the orphanage until high school, when he became a resident houseboy and gardener for a wealthy Hastings family. The story of Haines' early life appears as "From the Orphanage to the Lab" in the Story Collider podcast. and in his autobiography with Mindy Lewis, A Curious Life: From Rebel Orphan to Innovative Scientist. 

Haines attended the City College of New York, graduating in 1957. During that time he worked as live-in baby sitter for then-blacklisted American songwriter Jay Gorney (co-writer with Yip Harburg of the Depression era anthem, “Brother, Can You Spare a Dime?”) and his wife Sondra. There Haines came to know many other blacklisted professionals including actors Zero Mostel, Paul Robeson, and Lionel Stander, philosopher Barrows Dunham, and Bella Abzug, then a young lawyer defending blacklisted artists and intellectuals at HUAC hearings.

Career 
After CCNY, Haines became a laboratory assistant to Richard Block at the Boyce Thompson Institute where he studied the microorganism Ochromonas danica. In 1964 he obtained his Doctor of Philosophy degree in chemistry from Rutgers University.

Haines became Assistant Professor of Chemistry at City College in 1964 and Full Professor of Chemistry in 1972, a position he held until retiring in 2007. In 1972 he co-founded the Sophie Davis School of Biomedical Education with University President Robert Marshak. Haines taught biochemistry to undergraduates and served as Director of Biochemistry at the School from 1974 to 2006. He simultaneously taught as Professor of Biochemistry in the Doctoral Program of Biochemistry at the Graduate Center of the City University of New York.

Haines served as Visiting Professor at the Mitsubishi Institute in Japan, and in many other universities. He has published extensively on the structure and function of living membranes, including on the function of cholesterol in blocking sodium leakage through membranes, and most recently on the function of cardiolipin in the mitochondrial membrane.

In 2020, Haines was elected a Fellow of the American Association for the Advancement of Science "For initiating and setting up the CUNY Medical School at City College of New York to educate minority and disadvantaged students."

Personal life 
In 1960, Haines married painter Adrienne Rappaport, who used the name Adrian Rappin professionally. They had one daughter, Avril Haines, an attorney who is serving as the current Director of National Intelligence in the Biden Administration. Rappaport died in 1985 after developing chronic obstructive pulmonary disease and later contracting avian tuberculosis.

In 1986, Haines married his current wife, economist Mary Cleveland.

External links

References 

American biochemists
1933 births
Living people
City College of New York alumni
City College of New York faculty
Cornell University staff
Rutgers University alumni
Graduate Center, CUNY faculty
People from New York (state)
Biochemistry educators
Biochemists
Membrane proteins